In mathematics, parity is the property of an integer of whether it is even or odd. An integer is even if it is a multiple of two, and odd if it is not. For example, −4, 0, 82 are even because

By contrast, −3, 5, 7, 21 are odd numbers. The above definition of parity applies only to integer numbers, hence it cannot be applied to numbers like 1/2 or 4.201. See the section "Higher mathematics" below for some extensions of the notion of parity to a larger class of "numbers" or in other more general settings.

Even and odd numbers have opposite parities, e.g., 22 (even number) and 13 (odd number) have opposite parities. In particular, the parity of zero is even. Any two consecutive integers have opposite parity. A number (i.e., integer) expressed in the decimal numeral system is even or odd according to whether its last digit is even or odd. That is, if the last digit is 1, 3, 5, 7, or 9, then it is odd; otherwise it is even—as the last digit of any even number is 0, 2, 4, 6, or 8. The same idea will work using any even base. In particular, a number expressed in the binary numeral system is odd if its last digit is 1; and it is even if its last digit is 0. In an odd base, the number is even according to the sum of its digits—it is even if and only if the sum of its digits is even.

Definition 
An even number is an integer of the form

where k is an integer; an odd number is an integer of the form

An equivalent definition is that an even number is divisible by 2:

and an odd number is not:

The sets of even and odd numbers can be defined as following:

The consequences of this homomorphism are covered below.

Properties 
The following laws can be verified using the properties of divisibility. They are a special case of rules in modular arithmetic, and are commonly used to check if an equality is likely to be correct by testing the parity of each side. As with ordinary arithmetic, multiplication and addition are commutative and associative in modulo 2 arithmetic, and multiplication is distributive over addition. However, subtraction in modulo 2 is identical to addition, so subtraction also possesses these properties, which is not true for normal integer arithmetic.

Addition and subtraction 
 even ± even = even;
 even ± odd = odd;
 odd ± odd = even;

Multiplication
 even × even = even;
 even × odd = even;
 odd × odd = odd;

The structure ({even, odd}, +, ×) is in fact a field with two elements.

Division 
The division of two whole numbers does not necessarily result in a whole number. For example, 1 divided by 4 equals 1/4, which is neither even nor odd, since the concepts of even and odd apply only to integers. But when the quotient is an integer, it will be even if and only if the dividend has more factors of two than the divisor.

History
The ancient Greeks considered 1, the monad, to be neither fully odd nor fully even. Some of this sentiment survived into the 19th century: Friedrich Wilhelm August Fröbel's 1826 The Education of Man instructs the teacher to drill students with the claim that 1 is neither even nor odd, to which Fröbel attaches the philosophical afterthought,

Higher mathematics

Higher dimensions and more general classes of numbers

Integer coordinates of points in Euclidean spaces of two or more dimensions also have a parity, usually defined as the parity of the sum of the coordinates. For instance, the face-centered cubic lattice and its higher-dimensional that is generalizations, the Dn lattices, consist of all of the integer points whose sum of coordinates is even. This feature manifests itself in chess, where the parity of a square is indicated by its color: bishops are constrained to moving between squares of the same parity, whereas knights alternate parity between moves. This form of parity was famously used to solve the mutilated chessboard problem: if two opposite corner squares are removed from a chessboard, then the remaining board cannot be covered by dominoes, because each domino covers one square of each parity and there are two more squares of one parity than of the other.

The parity of an ordinal number may be defined to be even if the number is a limit ordinal, or a limit ordinal plus a finite even number, and odd otherwise.

Let R be a commutative ring and let I be an ideal of R whose index is 2. Elements of the coset  may be called even, while elements of the coset  may be called odd.
As an example, let  be the localization of Z at the prime ideal (2). Then an element of R is even or odd if and only if its numerator is so in Z.

Number theory
The even numbers form an ideal in the ring of integers, but the odd numbers do not—this is clear from the fact that the identity element for addition, zero, is an element of the even numbers only. An integer is even if it is congruent to 0 modulo this ideal, in other words if it is congruent to 0 modulo 2, and odd if it is congruent to 1 modulo 2.

All prime numbers are odd, with one exception: the prime number 2. All known perfect numbers are even; it is unknown whether any odd perfect numbers exist.

Goldbach's conjecture states that every even integer greater than 2 can be represented as a sum of two prime numbers. Modern computer calculations have shown this conjecture to be true for integers up to at least 4 × 1018, but still no general proof has been found.

Group theory

The parity of a permutation (as defined in abstract algebra) is the parity of the number of transpositions into which the permutation can be decomposed. For example (ABC) to (BCA) is even because it can be done by swapping A and B then C and A (two transpositions). It can be shown that no permutation can be decomposed both in an even and in an odd number of transpositions. Hence the above is a suitable definition. In Rubik's Cube, Megaminx, and other twisting puzzles, the moves of the puzzle allow only even permutations of the puzzle pieces, so parity is important in understanding the configuration space of these puzzles.

The Feit–Thompson theorem states that a finite group is always solvable if its order is an odd number.  This is an example of odd numbers playing a role in an advanced mathematical theorem where the method of application of the simple hypothesis of "odd order" is far from obvious.

Analysis
The parity of a function describes how its values change when its arguments are exchanged with their negations. An even function, such as an even power of a variable, gives the same result for any argument as for its negation. An odd function, such as an odd power of a variable, gives for any argument the negation of its result when given the negation of that argument. It is possible for a function to be neither odd nor even, and for the case f(x) = 0, to be both odd and even. The Taylor series of an even function contains only terms whose exponent is an even number, and the Taylor series of an odd function contains only terms whose exponent is an odd number.

Combinatorial game theory
In combinatorial game theory, an evil number is a number that has an even number of 1's in its binary representation, and an odious number is a number that has an odd number of 1's in its binary representation; these numbers play an important role in the strategy for the game Kayles. The parity function maps a number to the number of 1's in its binary representation, modulo 2, so its value is zero for evil numbers and one for odious numbers.  The Thue–Morse sequence, an infinite sequence of 0's and 1's, has a 0 in position i when i is evil, and a 1 in that position when i is odious.

Additional applications
In information theory, a parity bit appended to a binary number provides the simplest form of error detecting code. If a single bit in the resulting value is changed, then it will no longer have the correct parity: changing a bit in the original number gives it a different parity than the recorded one, and changing the parity bit while not changing the number it was derived from again produces an incorrect result. In this way, all single-bit transmission errors may be reliably detected. Some more sophisticated error detecting codes are also based on the use of multiple parity bits for subsets of the bits of the original encoded value.

In wind instruments with a cylindrical bore and in effect closed at one end, such as the clarinet at the mouthpiece, the harmonics produced are odd multiples of the fundamental frequency. (With cylindrical pipes open at both ends, used for example in some organ stops such as the open diapason, the harmonics are even multiples of the same frequency for the given bore length, but this has the effect of the fundamental frequency being doubled and all multiples of this fundamental frequency being produced.) See harmonic series (music).

In some countries, house numberings are chosen so that the houses on one side of a street have even numbers and the houses on the other side have odd numbers. Similarly, among United States numbered highways, even numbers primarily indicate east–west highways while odd numbers primarily indicate north–south highways. Among airline flight numbers, even numbers typically identify eastbound or northbound flights, and odd numbers typically identify westbound or southbound flights.

See also 
 Divisor
 Half-integer

References

 
Elementary arithmetic
Mathematical concepts